Jazz ist anders ("Jazz is different") is the eleventh full-length studio album by German rock band Die Ärzte. It was released on 2 November 2007. The album has a bonus-EP with three songs about the band and a hidden track. This is the first album after Debil that Die Ärzte produced alone. The cover is a reference to the most consumed food during their studio sessions: pizza. The whole packaging looks like a pizza box; the CD itself has a picture of a pizza on it and the bonus EP on their website is accessible using a code printed on paper in the shape of a green pepper. The EP looks like a tomato slice. The album has been criticized for not being as funny as one would expect from Die Ärzte, although it was very warmly received by fans.

Track listing

Bonus EP

 "Nimm es wie ein Mann (a.k.a. Kurt Cobain)" is after "Wir sind die lustigsten" on vinyl and download versions.

Singles
2007: "Junge"
2008: "Lied vom Scheitern"
2008: "Lasse redn"
2009: "Perfekt" "Breit" "Himmelblau"

Charts and certifications

Weekly charts

Year-end charts

Certifications

Economy

The "Economy" version CDs were sold on the concerts of the "Es wird eng" and "Jazzfäst" tours. The vinyl version is available from dealers.

On this version there are humorous changed versions of the 16 songs from Jazz ist anders. Also, after the last song, a mangled "Was hat der Junge doch für Nerven" (from Im Schatten der Ärzte) was included as a hidden track.

The CD looks like the backside of a pizza. The CD-Text features different jokes for titles; some are altered titles, some "hidden messages" and some totally disconnected longer jokes. Instead of lyrics, other jokes are present.

Economy versions of the bonus EP songs and some of the B-sides were released as B-sides to Jazz ist anders singles.

Personnel
Farin Urlaub – guitar, vocals
Bela Felsenheimer – drums, vocals
Rodrigo González – bass, vocals

References

External links

2007 albums
Die Ärzte albums
German-language albums